Victor Brenes, the Minister of Education of Costa Rica, served as a member of the National Council of the Asociación de Guías y Scouts de Costa Rica.
In 1988, Brenes was awarded the 199th Bronze Wolf, the only distinction of the World Organization of the Scout Movement, awarded by the World Scout Committee for exceptional services to world Scouting.

References

External links

Recipients of the Bronze Wolf Award
Year of birth missing
Scouting and Guiding in Costa Rica
Government ministers of Costa Rica